Andreja Milutinović (born 6 August 1990) is a Serbian professional basketball player for BCM U Pitești of the Liga Națională.

Professional career
Andreja grew up with FMP youth team, and later spent three years playing for their senior side. In 2011, Milutinović moved to Crvena zvezda signing one-year contract. In May 2012, he extended his contract for one more season. In February 2013, he parted ways with Crvena zvezda.

On October 5, 2013, Milutinović signed a contract with the Spanish 2nd tier league club Força Lleida. He had an option to leave if he gets some good offer from another club. He averaged 11.4 points, 3.5 rebounds and 1 assist per game. On January 11, 2014, in the middle of season, he signed a contract with the Greek team Apollon Patras until the end of season.

On July 31, 2014, Milutinović signed a two–year deal with Partizan Belgrade.

On August 19, 2016, Milutinović signed with Koroivos Amaliadas of the Greek Basket League.

On July 18, 2022, Milutinović signed with for BCM U Pitești of the Liga Națională.

See also 
 List of Serbian NBA Summer League players

References

External links

 Andreja Milutinović at aba-liga.com
 Andreja Milutinović at eurobasket.com
 Andreja Milutinović at fiba.com

1990 births
Living people
ABA League players
Apollon Patras B.C. players
Basketball League of Serbia players
KK Crvena zvezda players
KK FMP (1991–2011) players
KK Partizan players
Kecskeméti TE (basketball) players
Força Lleida CE players
Koroivos B.C. players
Serbian expatriate basketball people in France
Serbian expatriate basketball people in Greece
Serbian expatriate basketball people in Hungary
Serbian expatriate basketball people in Lithuania
Serbian expatriate basketball people in Romania
Serbian expatriate basketball people in Spain
Serbian expatriate basketball people in Qatar
Serbian men's basketball players
Small forwards
Sportspeople from Kragujevac